Te Poi is a small village in rural Waikato, New Zealand,  established in 1912 at the base of the Kaimai Range. Te Poi is part of a thriving farming area, particularly for dairying, thoroughbred horse breeding and cropping.

The village is serviced by a garage, a cafe, a pub/restaurant and many other small businesses, and has a public tennis court. There are trout fishing spots nearby.

From Te Poi, it is 40 minutes to Tauranga, 35 minutes to Rotorua, 45 minutes to Hamilton, two hours to skiing at Mount Ruapehu on the Central Plateau and two hours to Auckland.

History and culture

Te Poi built a memorial hall in 1922 to commemorate fallen soldiers from World War I. It built another memorial hall to commemorate its fallen sons from World War II.

Te Poi was the site of the Sunny Park-Hinuera Cooperative Dairy Company, known for its casein production. In 1983 Sunny Park buildings were auctioned off after the merger with the Waikato Dairy Company. The village has weathered the loss of the factory well due to its central location.

The town celebrated its district centenary on 31 March 2012.

Marae
Te Poi has three marae, affiliated with Ngāti Raukawa hapū. Rengarenga Marae is affiliated with Ngāti Mōtai and Ngāti Te Apunga. Te Omeka Marae and Tiriki Teihaua meeting house are affiliated with Ngāti Kirihika. Te Ūkaipō Marae and Wehiwehi meeting house are affiliated with Ngāti Kirihika and Ngāti Wehiwehi.

Demographics
The SA1 area is part of the larger Te Poi statistical area.

The SA1 area had a population of 210 at the 2018 New Zealand census, an increase of 18 people (9.4%) since the 2013 census, and an increase of 30 people (16.7%) since the 2006 census. There were 72 households, comprising 117 males and 90 females, giving a sex ratio of 1.3 males per female. The median age was 34.6 years (compared with 37.4 years nationally), with 48 people (22.9%) aged under 15 years, 39 (18.6%) aged 15 to 29, 102 (48.6%) aged 30 to 64, and 24 (11.4%) aged 65 or older.

Ethnicities were 90.0% European/Pākehā, 15.7% Māori, 0.0% Pacific peoples, 2.9% Asian, and 1.4% other ethnicities. People may identify with more than one ethnicity.

Although some people chose not to answer the census's question about religious affiliation, 61.4% had no religion, 30.0% were Christian, 2.9% had Māori religious beliefs and 1.4% had other religions.

Of those at least 15 years old, 18 (11.1%) people had a bachelor's or higher degree, and 36 (22.2%) people had no formal qualifications. The median income was $36,000, compared with $31,800 nationally. 21 people (13.0%) earned over $70,000 compared to 17.2% nationally. The employment status of those at least 15 was that 96 (59.3%) people were employed full-time, 30 (18.5%) were part-time, and 3 (1.9%) were unemployed.

Te Poi statistical area

Te Poi statistical area had a population of 840 at the 2018 New Zealand census, an increase of 39 people (4.9%) since the 2013 census, and an increase of 21 people (2.6%) since the 2006 census. There were 288 households, comprising 450 males and 393 females, giving a sex ratio of 1.15 males per female. The median age was 33.9 years (compared with 37.4 years nationally), with 213 people (25.4%) aged under 15 years, 159 (18.9%) aged 15 to 29, 390 (46.4%) aged 30 to 64, and 78 (9.3%) aged 65 or older.

Ethnicities were 84.3% European/Pākehā, 18.6% Māori, 2.5% Pacific peoples, 6.1% Asian, and 2.9% other ethnicities. People may identify with more than one ethnicity.

The percentage of people born overseas was 14.3, compared with 27.1% nationally.

Although some people chose not to answer the census's question about religious affiliation, 48.6% had no religion, 38.9% were Christian, 5.0% had Māori religious beliefs, 0.4% were Muslim and 0.7% had other religions.

Of those at least 15 years old, 87 (13.9%) people had a bachelor's or higher degree, and 120 (19.1%) people had no formal qualifications. The median income was $39,100, compared with $31,800 nationally. 99 people (15.8%) earned over $70,000 compared to 17.2% nationally. The employment status of those at least 15 was that 369 (58.9%) people were employed full-time, 117 (18.7%) were part-time, and 12 (1.9%) were unemployed.

Education

Older children go to Matamata by bus for intermediate and secondary school.

References

External links
 Matamata Piako District Council

Populated places in Waikato
Matamata-Piako District